In number theory, the Moser–de Bruijn sequence is an integer sequence named after Leo Moser and Nicolaas Govert de Bruijn, consisting of the sums of distinct powers of 4, or equivalently the numbers whose binary representations are nonzero only in even positions.

These numbers grow in proportion to the square numbers, and are the squares for a modified form of arithmetic without carrying. When the values in the sequence are doubled, their differences are all non-square. Every non-negative integer has a unique representation as the sum of a sequence member and a doubled sequence member. This decomposition into sums can be used to define a bijection between the integers and pairs of integers, to define coordinates for the Z-order curve, and to construct inverse pairs of transcendental numbers with simple decimal representations.

A simple recurrence relation allows values of the Moser–de Bruijn sequence to be calculated from earlier values, and can be used to prove that the Moser–de Bruijn sequence is a 2-regular sequence.

Definition and examples
The numbers in the Moser–de Bruijn sequence are formed by adding distinct powers of four. The sequence lists these numbers in sorted order; it begins

For instance, 69 belongs to this sequence because it equals 64 + 4 + 1, a sum of three distinct powers of 4.

Binary and related representations
Another definition of the Moser–de Bruijn sequence is that it is the ordered sequence of numbers whose binary representation has nonzero digits only in the even positions. For instance, 69 belongs to the sequence, because its binary representation 10001012 has nonzero digits in the positions for 26, 22, and 20, all of which have even exponents. The numbers in the sequence can also be described as the numbers whose base-4 representation uses only the digits 0 or 1. For a number in this sequence, the base-4 representation can be found from the binary representation by skipping the binary digits in odd positions, which should all be zero. The hexadecimal representation of these numbers contains only the digits 0, 1, 4, 5. For instance, 69 = 10114 = 4516. Equivalently, they are the numbers whose binary and negabinary representations are equal. Because there are no two consecutive nonzeros in their binary representations, the Moser–de Bruijn sequence forms a subsequence of the fibbinary numbers.

It follows from either the binary or base-4 definitions of these numbers that they grow roughly in proportion to the square numbers.
a fact which is also true of the square numbers. In fact the numbers in the Moser–de Bruijn sequence are the squares for a version of arithmetic without carrying on binary numbers, in which the addition and multiplication of single bits are respectively the exclusive or and logical conjunction operations.

In connection with the Furstenberg–Sárközy theorem on sequences of numbers with no square difference, Imre Z. Ruzsa found a construction for large square-difference-free sets that, like the binary definition of the Moser–de Bruijn sequence, restricts the digits in alternating positions in the base- numbers. When applied to the base , Ruzsa's construction generates the Moser–de Bruijn sequence multiplied by two, a set that is again square-difference-free. However,
this set is too sparse to provide nontrivial lower bounds for the Furstenberg–Sárközy theorem.

Unique representation as sums
The Moser–de Bruijn sequence obeys a property similar to that of a Sidon sequence: the sums , where  and  both belong to the Moser–de Bruijn sequence, are all unique. No two of these sums have the same value. Moreover, every integer  can be represented as a sum , where  and  both belong to the Moser–de Bruijn sequence.

Extending the property,  found infinitely many other linear expressions like  that, when  and  both belong to the Moser–de Bruijn sequence, uniquely represent all integers.

Z-order curve and successor formula
The inverse of this bijection gives a linear ordering on the points in the plane with non-negative integer coordinates, which may be used to define the Z-order curve.

In connection with this application, it is convenient to have a formula to generate each successive element of the Moser–de Bruijn sequence from its predecessor. This can be done as follows.
and then masking off the filled-in bits. Filling the bits and adding one can be combined into a single addition operation. That is, the next member is the number given by the formula

Subtraction game
 investigated a subtraction game, analogous to subtract a square, based on this sequence. In Golomb's game, two players take turns removing coins from a pile of  coins. In each move, a player may remove any number of coins that belongs to the Moser–de Bruijn sequence. Removing any other number of coins is not allowed. The winner is the player who removes the last coin.
As Golomb observes, the "cold" positions of this game (the ones in which the player who is about to move is losing) are exactly the positions of the form  where  belongs to the Moser–de Bruijn sequence. A winning strategy for playing this game is to decompose the current number of coins, into  where  and  both belong to the Moser–de Bruijn sequence, and then (if  is nonzero) to remove  coins, leaving a cold position to the other player. If  is zero, this strategy is not possible, and there is no winning move.

Decimal reciprocals
Let  denote the Moser–de Bruijn sequence itself. Then for

Alternatively, one can write:

Similar examples also work in other bases. For instance, the two binary numbers whose nonzero bits are in the same positions as the nonzero digits of the two decimal numbers above are also irrational reciprocals. These binary and decimal numbers, and the numbers defined in the same way for any other base by repeating a single nonzero digit in the positions given by the Moser–de Bruijn sequence, are transcendental numbers. Their transcendence can be proven from the fact that the long strings of zeros in their digits allow them to be approximated more accurately by rational numbers than would be allowed by Roth's theorem if they were algebraic numbers, having irrationality measure no less than 3.

Generating function
The generating function

whose exponents in the expanded form are given by the Moser–de Bruijn sequence,
obeys the functional equations

and

The fact that they are reciprocals is an instance of the first of the two functional equations.
The partial products of the product form of the generating function can be used to generate the convergents of the continued fraction expansion of these numbers themselves, as well as multiples of them.

Recurrence and regularity
The Moser–de Bruijn sequence obeys a recurrence relation that allows the th value of the sequence,  (starting at ) to be determined from the value at 

Iterating this recurrence allows any subsequence of the form  to be expressed as a linear function of the original sequence, meaning that the Moser–de Bruijn sequence is a 2-regular sequence.

See also
 Stanley sequence and Cantor set, sets defined similarly using the base-3 representations of their elements

Notes

External links

Integer sequences
Binary arithmetic